Randy K. Avent from the North Carolina State University, Raleigh, NC was named Fellow of the Institute of Electrical and Electronics Engineers (IEEE) in 2015 for leadership in automatic target recognition technology.  He is the first and current President of Florida Polytechnic University.

References 

Fellow Members of the IEEE
Living people
MIT Lincoln Laboratory people
Year of birth missing (living people)
Place of birth missing (living people)
American electrical engineers